Tipi (also tepee and teepee) is a dwelling used by North American Indians of the Great Plains.

Tipi, Tepee, Teepee or Tee pee may also refer to
 The children's television series Tipi Tales
 The children's book Tipi: Home of the Nomadic Buffalo Hunters
 The Lone Teepee, a landmark along the Seventh Cavalry's march to the Battle of the Little Big Horn
 Teepee Airport, Alberta, Canada
 Tepee Buttes, a range in North Dakota
 Teepee Creek, Alberta, Canada
 Teepee burners, a type of wood waste burner
 Tee Pee Records
 The Tepee, listed on the U.S. National Register of Historic Places
Teepee structure, a geological structure

See also
TP (disambiguation)